Acanthocerus lobatus is a species of leaf-footed bug in the family Coreidae. It is found in the Caribbean Sea, North America, and the Caribbean.

References

Articles created by Qbugbot
Insects described in 1835
Acanthocerini